The Cypriot First Division is the top tier football league competition in Cyprus, run by the Cyprus Football Association. Since February 2016, it is sponsored by Cyta and is thus officially known as the Cyta Championship. The league is contested by 14 teams and runs from August to May, with the three lowest-placed teams being relegated to the Cypriot Second Division, and replaced by the top three teams in that division.

History

Football was introduced to Cyprus early in the 20th century by the British. Initially played in the island's schools, it proved hugely popular and a number of clubs were duly formed.

Since 1911, when Anorthosis Famagusta FC was founded, many clubs were established and in 1932 the Cypriot Championship began annually at first unofficially. Every season, the championship was organized by a different football club which caused some conflicts between some of the teams.

As football became more established, the clubs were united in agreeing that an official body was needed to regulate the sport. And in September 1934, the Cyprus Football Association (CFA) was formed and the Cypriot Championship and Cup began to take place annually. The first Champions of Cyprus were Trust in 1935 but the club folded three years later. The 1930s were dominated by APOEL, who won five championship in a row until 1940. Like other Championships in the World, the Cypriot Championship was interrupted, due to World War II from 1941 until 1945.

The Cypriot Championship unification, lasted for only two seasons. In 1955, Çetinkaya Türk S.K., who had been the only Turkish Cypriot team playing in the Cypriot First Division since 1934–35, withdrew from the Championship and with other Turkish Cypriot teams, established the Cyprus Turkish Football Federation, with its own competitions. The reason behind this was political, as the Turkish Cypriots were opposed to the anticolonial struggle of EOKA and union with Greece (Enosis). However, this Federation was never recognized and no team of that federation could play in international competitions.

The independence of Cyprus in 1960, was followed by full membership for the Cyprus Football Association to UEFA in 1962. From 1963, the champions of the Cyprus, could compete in the European Champions Cup and the Cup winners in the European Cup Winners Cup. Since 1971, the runners up in the Greek Cypriot First Division can compete in the UEFA Cup. From 1967 until 1974, the Greek Cypriot Champions were promoted to the Greek First National Division. Greek Cypriot teams were relegated every season from the Alpha Ethniki, apart from 1974, when APOEL managed to remain in the Greek Championship which meant that Cyprus would have two teams in Alpha Ethniki. However, due to the Turkish invasion of Cyprus that year, APOEL and Omonia (the champion of Cyprus for 1974) withdrew from the League.

Format

Current format
As of the 2022-23 season, 14 clubs compete in the league, and are ranked based on the Point System, as described below. Each club plays the other sides twice, home and away, for a total of 26 games for each club. This is referred to as the first round of the league. In the second round, the teams are divided into two groups; The teams ranked 1st to 6th play-off for the title and European spots in Group A, while the bottom eight teams battle to avoid relegation in Group B. Group A is often referred to as the Championship Play-offs, while Group B is referred to as the Relegation Play-offs. Each team's points and criteria such as goal difference, goals scored, etc. are retained during the transition from first to second round. Similarly to the first round, every club plays the other sides twice, for a total of 10 or 14 games for each club, in Group A or Group B respectively.

At the end of the second round, the club ranked 1st in Group A is declared the winner of the league. The champion qualifies for the UEFA Champions League, while the second and third placed teams enter the UEFA Europa Conference League. If the cup winners finish in third or above, the fourth placed team also enters the UEFA Europa Conference League. Meanwhile, the bottom three teams in Group B are relegated to the Second Division.

Previous formats
From 2007–08 until 2012–13 season, in the second round the first 12 (out of 14) teams were separated into three groups of four teams according to their position at the end of the first round. For the 2013–14 season, in the second round the first 12 (out of 14) teams were separated into two groups of six teams according to their position at the end of the first round. The last two teams of the first round were relegated directly to the B1 Division and the bottom two teams of the relegation group also. The points from the first round were carried to the second round and the teams played each other twice.

Point System
The point system of the Cypriot First Division has changed throughout the years:
 From 1934–35 until 1959–60, teams were awarded two points for a win, one point for a draw and zero points for a defeat.
 From 1960–61 until 1969–70, teams were awarded three points for a win, two points for a draw and one point for a defeat.
 From 1970–71 until 1990–91, teams were awarded two points for a win, one point for a draw and zero points for a defeat.
 Since the 1991–92 season, teams are awarded three points for a win, one point for a draw and zero points for a defeat.
In the event that two or more teams have the same amount of points, they are ranked based on:

 Points gained in games between the teams, in both rounds.
 Goal difference in games between the teams, in both rounds.
 Most away goals scored in games between the teams, in both rounds.
 Goal difference across all games, in both rounds.
 Most goals scored across all games, in both rounds.

2022–23 Clubs

Champions

Performances

Performance by club

Appearances in the top division
The below table indicates the total number of seasons each club has participated in the Cypriot First Division, up to and including the 2022/23 season.

44 teams have played at least one season in First Division. 

Teams in bold are participating in the 2022-23 Cypriot First Division.

 The 1963–64 Cypriot First Division, where the championship was abandoned, is not included in the table.
 Çetinkaya total includes 12 when competing as Lefkosa Turk Spor Kulubu
 APEP Pitsilia total includes one as APEP Limassol

All-time Cypriot First Division table (1934–35 until 2017–18)
The All-time Cypriot First Division table is a ranking of all Cypriot football clubs based on their performance in the Cypriot First Division. The points are the sum of the points of all seasons, despite the point system of the season. The 1963–64 Cypriot First Division season is not included because the championship was abandoned.

See also
Cypriot First Division top goalscorers
List of foreign football players in Cypriot First Division

References

Bibliography

External links
Top Scorers per season
Cypriot First Division summary - Soccerway

 
1934 establishments in Cyprus
Top level football leagues in Europe
1
Sports leagues established in 1934

it:Campionato cipriota di calcio